Omen III: The Final Conflict (also released as simply The Final Conflict) is a 1981 supernatural horror film directed by Graham Baker. It is the third installment in The Omen series. Starring Sam Neill, Lisa Harrow and Rossano Brazzi, the film tells the progression of the now adult Damien Thorn to a position of earthly power, set against the countdown to the Second Coming and attempts of a group of priests to kill the Antichrist. Richard Donner, director of the first Omen film, returns as executive producer. The film was released in theatres on March 20, 1981.

Plot 
Following the grisly suicide of the U.S. Ambassador to the United Kingdom, 33-year-old international conglomerate CEO Damien Thorn is appointed in his place, an office his adoptive father, Robert Thorn, once held. Having fully embraced his unholy lineage and having run his company for seven years, Damien now attempts to reshape his destiny by halting the Second Coming of Christ.

However, Father DeCarlo, a priest from the Subiaco monastery where Father Spiletto spent his final days and who has observed Damien from afar since his adopted father's death, acquires the Seven Daggers of Megiddo that were dug out of the ruins of the Thorn Museum in Chicago following the fire at the end of the second movie. Joined by six other priests, DeCarlo plans to kill Damien while finding the Christ child. Meanwhile, Damien becomes romantically involved with journalist Kate Reynolds. Learning of his assassins and killing all but DeCarlo over time, he proceeds to mold Reynolds's young son Peter into a disciple by playing on the boy's desire for a father figure.

After the alignment of stars in the Cassiopeia constellation on March 24, 1981, generating what is described as a second Star of Bethlehem, Damien realizes that it is a sign of the Second Coming and orders his followers to kill all boys born in England on the morning of March 24, 1981 to prevent the Christ's return to power. A week after a string of 31 infant deaths, Reynolds encounters DeCarlo and he reveals Damien's true identity to her while giving her evidence of the murders. The following morning she discovers Damien's birthmark.

Damien tells Peter to follow DeCarlo, resulting in Damien learning that his adviser, Harvey Dean, had concealed the date of his son's birth when Peter reports that DeCarlo visited Dean's wife Barbara and revealed her husband's role in the infant murders. Dean refuses to kill his son and makes preparations to flee the country, only to return home and be killed by his wife who just killed their son with a burning iron while under Damien's demonic influence.

DeCarlo later visits Reynolds and reveals that Peter is now under Damien's influence and that the real Christ child is now beyond Damien's reach. Agreeing to help DeCarlo, Reynolds tricks Damien with the promise to bring him to the church ruins where the Christ child is in exchange for Peter. The plan backfires when Damien spots DeCarlo first and uses Peter as a human shield against the dagger. As Peter dies in his mother's arms, Damien throttles Father DeCarlo before calling out for Christ to appear before him and "face him". This leaves Damien open to be stabbed in the back by Reynolds using DeCarlo's Megiddo dagger.

As Damien staggers through the courtyard and collapses, a vision of Christ appears in the archway above him. Damien mocks Christ for thinking he has won, and then dies. DeCarlo reappears carrying Peter's body and hands him to a praying Kate. As they leave the ruins, Bible passages are shown on-screen.

Cast 

 Sam Neill as Damien Thorn
 Lisa Harrow as Kate Reynolds
 Rossano Brazzi as Father DeCarlo
 Don Gordon as Harvey Pleydell Dean
 Barnaby Holm as Peter Reynolds
 Leueen Willoughby as Barbara Dean
 Marc Boyle as Brother Benito
 Milos Kirek as Brother Martin
 Tommy Duggan as Brother Matteus
 Louis Mahoney as Brother Paulo
 Richard Oldfield as Brother Simeon
 Tony Vogel as Brother Antonio
 Hugh Moxey as Butler
 Mason Adams as U.S. President
 Robert Arden as U.S. Ambassador to Great Britain
 Ruby Wax (uncredited) as U.S. Ambassador's secretary
 Hazel Court (uncredited) as champagne woman at hunt

Production

Locales and filming 
The evening party scene was filmed in Brocket Hall, just outside London, which also substituted as Damien's residence. Kate, Damien, and Peter walk from Hyde Park to Speakers Corner. The Moors sequence was shot in Cornwall including Roche Rock with added visuals for the lightning. The Disciples Of The Watch sequence was shot at around 4–5 am in one night in the North York Moors. The finale was shot at Fountains Abbey in North Yorkshire. "Shooting here was very cold and very eerie," according to Graham Baker's commentary on the DVD. University of London Observatory in Mill Hill, London (identified as "Hendon" in Baker's commentary) substituted for the Fernbank Observatory for The Second Coming sequence.

The crew did not go back to Subiaco to film the exterior location of the monastery as it only appears in two scenes in this film; footage from the first film was reused. Stock footage from The Omen was also used when the Ambassador, who kills himself at the beginning of the film, walks to the United States Embassy. The footage of the White House featured in the film was taken from Superman II, subtracting the visual effects.

Lisa Harrow said one of the most difficult sequences to shoot for the film was the death of the first priest in the television studio where her character Kate Reynolds interviews Damien.  It took over two weeks to get right. It is considered one of the nastiest mainstream movie deaths, involving a priest burning to death whilst trapped in melting plastic sheets. The scene where Barbara saw a vision of her baby burned/dead was shot on slate 666 and the camera jammed according to director Graham Baker. Stuntman Vic Armstrong performed the backwards one-hundred-foot fall from the bridge. In Guinness World Records 2005, he described it as the most frightening stunt of his career. Most of his falls were less than seventy feet.

Music 
The score to The Final Conflict was composed by Jerry Goldsmith, who had also composed the Academy Award winning music for The Omen and the score for its sequel Damien: Omen II. The score was performed by the National Philharmonic Orchestra, conducted by Lionel Newman (who also conducted the scores for the previous two movies).

True to the style of his first two scores, Goldsmith used an orchestral/choral blend with light electronic elements to create the film's sound, though unlike the soundtrack to Damien, The Final Conflict makes no pronounced reference to the original Omen theme "Ave Satani", which had earned him an Academy Award nomination for Best Original Song in 1976. Instead, Goldsmith composed an all-new theme for the character of Damien introduced during the opening credits which emphasized robust tragedy over the more horrific sound of its prequel scores. Goldsmith also composed a new theme for the rebirth of Christ first introduced at the end of "Main Title" and later given full Romantic treatment with orchestra and choir at the film's climax in "The Final Conflict".

The score has been released twice on album though Varèse Sarabande: first in 1986, featuring thirteen tracks of score at a running time just over forty-eight minutes; and an expanded version on 9 September 2001, which features fifteen tracks of score at a running time of just under sixty-three minutes.

1986 Album
 "Main Title" (3:22)
 "The Ambassador" (4:45)
 "Trial Run" (2:10)
 "The Monastery" (3:13)
 "A T.V. First" (2:45)
 "The Second Coming" (3:16)
 "Electric Storm" (5:17)
 "The Hunt" (3:58)
 "The Blooding Reel" (3:32)
 "Lost Children" (3:40)
 "Parted Hair" (6:30)
 "The Iron" (2:18)
 "The Final Conflict" (3:40)

2001 Album
 "Main Title" (3:29)
 "The Ambassador" (4:50)
 "Trial Run" (2:15)
 "The Monastery" (3:17)
 "A T.V. First" (2:51)
 "The Statue" (4:11)
 "The Second Coming" (3:25)
 "Electric Storm" (5:22)
 "The Hunt" (4:05)
 "The Blooding" (3:40)
 "Lost Children" (3:45)
 "666" (3:03)
 "Parted Hair" (6:36)
 "The Iron" (2:30)
 "The Final Conflict" (9:22)

Alternative titles 
When first released in 1981, the film's original official title was simply The Final Conflict. Later, the title was adjusted to Omen III: The Final Conflict in home releases in order to accentuate its link to the other two films in the cycle. However, the opening title sequence still shows the original title without "Omen III" displayed.

In Germany and Hungary, the film was released as Barbara's Baby, a play on the title Rosemary's Baby. This title also appeared on some posters in many countries before the eventual title was announced.

Reception 
Omen III: The Final Conflict received mixed to negative reviews from critics. On review aggregator website Rotten Tomatoes, the film received an approval rating of 29% based on 21 reviews, with an average rating of 4.4/10.

Roger Ebert gave the film 2 stars out of 4, writing that it became "a growing disappointment, as we realize that the apocalyptic confrontation between the forces of good and evil is being reduced to a bunch of guys with Italian accents running around trying to stab Damien in the back." Ebert and Gene Siskel also gave the film "No" ratings on their TV show, finding the movie to be boring and frankly small-scale relative to the material it was trying to present, and concluding they were happy that the OMEN series had come to its stopping point. Variety called the film "the funniest one yet" in the Omen series, adding that Neill played his part "with an emotional range of shifting his eyes to the left, then shifting his eyes to the right, a practice no doubt perfected while watching dailies." Sheila Benson of the Los Angeles Times praised the film for mostly avoiding "the sort of tacky, splashy deaths" of the first two entries and concluded that Baker "has rounded off the gaudy trilogy with the most surprising qualities possible: intelligence and elegant visual style." Gary Arnold of The Washington Post wrote that the film "makes no case for prolonging the saga of 'The Omen' one last groggy round ... Moviegoers who expected the concluding chapter of The Omen Trilogy to supply a ringside seat at Armageddon should be prepared for conflict on a far punier scale."

Larry Kart of the Chicago Tribune gave the film 1.5 stars out of 4, praising Sam Neill's performance as "the only thing" the film had going for it, but criticizing the plot in particular as "barren of suspense. For instance, at the beginning of the film, we're told that the world is in an unprecedented state of chaos, which should be the case if the Second Coming is due. But never again do we get a hint of external uproar, as the characters toddle about in a London that seems in quite decent shape." Richard Combs of The Monthly Film Bulletin wrote that the film "somehow becomes a hell-and-brimstone version of Whitehall farce ... Damien just comes across as an ambitious junior executive who overreaches himself." John Marrone of Bloody Disgusting said that "[The movie has] some gore and darkness, but nothing compared to the first two – even Jerry Goldsmith’s soundtrack is awkward – a little too “noisy” and overdone."

Sequel 
A sequel, titled Omen IV: Armageddon, was planned for release in late 1984, with a screenplay by Damien: Omen II'''s Stanley Mann, based on the novel Omen IV: Armageddon 2000 by author Gordon McGill. Graham Baker would return to direct, but scheduling conflicts with Impulse prevented him from doing so. He was briefly replaced by television director Horace D. Burton, but the film's developments where stalled again by Burton's untimely death in 1983, leading 20th Century Fox to ultimately cancel the production. Later, McGill wrote a final Omen novel called Omen V: The Abomination.

In 1991, another sequel, Omen IV: The Awakening, was produced for television in a failed attempt by 20th Century Fox to revive the films as a horror franchise in the style of Halloween, Friday the 13th, and A Nightmare on Elm Street''.

References

External links 

 
 
 
 

1981 films
1981 horror films
American supernatural horror films
American political thriller films
British horror films
American sequel films
Films shot at EMI-Elstree Studios
20th Century Fox films
Films directed by Graham Baker
Films scored by Jerry Goldsmith
The Omen (franchise)
Fictional depictions of the Antichrist
Filicide in fiction
Mariticide in fiction
British sequel films
Films about rape
1981 directorial debut films
1980s English-language films
1980s American films
1980s British films